The Seaview SVII is an underwater camera designed by the Catlin Seaview Survey team, intended to photograph coral reefs to provide visual documentation of a reef's health. The camera is designed to be controlled by a diver in shallow waters, and is propelled at a constant slow speed by a propeller mounted near the rear of the camera. Only two SVIIs are currently in existence. The cameras were used by the Catlin Seaview Survey and Google to create Google Ocean, a means of displaying underwater images using Google's existing Street View platform.

Purpose 

The SVII camera was designed as a replacement for its prototype predecessor, the SVI, to take thousands of images of the shallow waters of the Great Barrier Reef and other endangered coral reefs around the world. The imagery and data generated by the camera and its operators is intended to provide a visual record of the health of the reefs, creating a baseline record for the reefs' health to be compared to future surveys. Additionally, the images will be made available by Google using the Google Maps Street View platform, to increase public awareness of the risks faced by coral reefs.

Specifications 

The SVII is based upon its prototype, the SVI. Both cameras are self-propelling underwater housings for a set of three Canon 5D cameras using wide-angle lenses. The images are then stitched together to create a 360-degree panorama of the area, in a format which can be uploaded online for public viewing.

The SVII is controlled by a Samsung Galaxy Tab tablet to permit the user to change settings, and download or view images. The improved design also allows users to recharge the camera more easily and quickly than with the SVI. While intended for more widespread use, there are currently four SVIIs in existence.

The SVII was invented and developed by Underwater Earth, in collaboration with Panedia and manufactured by ClaroWorks, the product development side of Dive Xtras. The SVII uses some technology developed by Dive Xtras / ClaroWorks; such as the underwater tablet housing and vehicle.

Imagery 

Much of the imagery taken by the cameras is now available on Google Maps, for the following locations:
Lady Elliot Island, Great Barrier Reef
Heron Island, Great Barrier Reef
Wilson Island, Great Barrier Reef
Apo Island, Philippines
Hanauma Bay, Hawaii
Molokini, Hawaii

References

External links 
 "Virtual Dive" of Heron Island, using images from the SVII

Cameras